The 2009 LG Hockey Games was held in Stockholm, Sweden, from 5 to 8 February 2009. The games were hosted in Globen, except one which was played in Prague, Czech Republic. The tournament was a part of the Euro Hockey Tour 2008–09. Sweden won the tournament before Finland and Russia.

Standings

Results 
All times are local (UTC+1).

See also
LG Hockey Games

References

External links
Hockeyarchives 

2008–09 Euro Hockey Tour
2008–09 in Swedish ice hockey
2008–09 in Russian ice hockey
2008–09 in Finnish ice hockey
2008–09 in Czech ice hockey
Sweden Hockey Games
February 2009 sports events in Europe
2000s in Stockholm
2000s in Prague
Sports competitions in Prague